Oakwood Cemetery is a  historic cemetery located in Syracuse, New York.  It was designed by Howard Daniels and built in 1859.  Oakwood Cemetery was created during a time period in the nineteenth century when the rural cemetery was becoming a distinct landscape type, and is a good example of this kind of landscape architecture.

A crew of 60 laborers without large-scale earth moving equipment thinned and grouped the trees; today there are many 150-year-old specimens. Students of SUNY-ESF and Syracuse University, whose campuses are adjacent to Oakwood, can regularly be seen in the cemetery for instruction on plant species, capturing insect specimens, cemetery studies, or mammal surveys.

History
Oakwood was an immediate success after its dedication in November 1859. Thousands of visitors led to the establishment of omnibus service directly to the cemetery gates. Additions to the original acreage were laid out in a manner sympathetic to the original design. The Oakwood Cemetery project, run by Syracuse University libraries, digitizes and preserves valuable cemetery records.

Notable interments

Notable interments at Oakwood Cemetery include:
 Anna Short Harrington (1897–1955), Working at the time as A Syracuse house maid, Anna Was discovered by “Quaker Oats Co." in 1935 while cooking her locally famous pancake recipe at the Syracuse state fair, at which time she became the marketing face of “Aunt Jemima”; An institutionally racist depiction of the “Mammy”-stereotype, used as a marketing tool.
 Charles Andrews (1827–1918), chief judge of the NY Court of Appeals
 Edward Gayer Andrews (1825–1907), a bishop of the Methodist Episcopal Church
 Maltbie D. Babcock (1858–1901), 19th-century clergyman and author
 Union Major General Henry A. Barnum (1833–1892), recipient of the Medal of Honor
 Willis B. Burns (1851–1915), businessman, Mayor of Syracuse, member of the New York State Assembly
 George F. Comstock (1811–1892), lawyer, politician, and judge, previous owner of the land tract where the cemetery stands
 Stephen D. Dillaye (1820–1884), politician, lawyer, journalist
 Herbert H. Franklin (1866–1956), American automobile magnate, businessman and industrialist
 Amos P. Granger (1789–1866), became a general following the War of 1812
 John A. Green, a Utica native who served as brigadier general in the Civil War
 William Jervis Hough (1795–1869), attorney, a general in the New York Militia of Cazenovia, 8th Cavalry Regiment, and a representative in the United States Congress
 Jesse Truesdell Peck (1811–1883), a bishop of the Methodist Episcopal Church and founder of Syracuse University
 Irene Sargent (1852–1932), art historian and Syracuse University faculty member
 Joseph Lyman Silsbee (1848–1913), architect
 Lyman Cornelius Smith (1850–1910), American industrialist
 Union Major General Edwin Vose Sumner (1797–1863)
 Comfort Tyler (1764–1827), early pioneer in Syracuse, New York
 Ernest Lynn Waldorf (1876–1943), American bishop of the Methodist Episcopal Church
 John M. Wieting (1817–1888), American lecturer and philanthropist

Gallery

See also 
 Rural Cemetery Act (1847), New York State Legislature

References

External links

 
 Historic Oakwood Cemetery Preservation Association
 Oakwood Cemetery at Abandoned
 

Cemeteries in Syracuse, New York
Tourist attractions in Syracuse, New York
1859 establishments in New York (state)
Monuments and memorials in Syracuse, New York